Kherur Mosque (also known as Kheraul Mosque) is located at Kherur in the Sagardighi CD block in the Jangipur subdivision of Murshidabad district, West Bengal, India.

Geography

Location

History
It is a “brick-built mosque, with a square prayer chamber and a verandah on the front”. It was built by Rafa’t Khan, in 1495, during the reign of Alauddin Hussain Shah.

According to the Archaeological Survey of India, as mentioned in the List of Monuments of National Importance in West Bengal the Kherur Mosque is an ASI Listed Monument.

Amitabha Gupta writes in his photogapher's note: This brick-built Mosque at Kheraul alias Kherur with a single domed square prayer chamber and a triple domed verandah on the front with four minarets at four corners was erected by Rafa't Khan in 1495 AD during the reign of Alaud-Din Husain Shah on the basis of two inscriptions on the mosque. The hemispherical dome of the main prayer chamber fell down in the earthquake of 1897. The mosque is constructed entirely of brick without any stone facing. This mosque at Kheraul is  unique because of its terracotta decorations on its wall. Only a handful of mosques have such decorations on their walls and they predate the famous terracotta temples of Bengal which were constructed between 17th to 19th century.

Kherur Mosque picture gallery

References

External links

Mosques in West Bengal
Tourist attractions in Murshidabad
Monuments of National Importance in West Bengal